is a Japanese footballer currently playing as a midfielder for Tegevajaro Miyazaki.

Club career
Kamino was sent on a two-year loan deal to Tegevajaro Miyazaki from Kagoshima United in 2020. Following this loan deal, in which he made one appearance in the Emperor's Cup, Kamino completed a full transfer ahead of the 2022 season.

Career statistics

Club
.

Notes

References

2001 births
Living people
Association football people from Kagoshima Prefecture
Japanese footballers
Association football midfielders
J3 League players
Kagoshima United FC players
Tegevajaro Miyazaki players